Masaka Local Council FC, or short Masaka, is a Ugandan football club from Masaka.

They play in the top division of Ugandan football, the Ugandan Super League.

Stadium
Currently the team plays at the 1000 capacity Masaka Recreation Ground.

References

External links
Soccerway

Football clubs in Uganda
Works association football teams